George Heussenstamm (born July 24, 1926) is an American composer.  His most well-known works include jazz-classical chamber styles, such as Etudes (7) for oboe, clarinet & bassoon, Op. 77 (1964),  Alchemy for solo oboe and tape, Op. 60 (1976), and Ensembles, for brass quintet (1976). Recordings of his compositions include Woodwind Treasures by the West Wind Quintet and Alchemy: American Works for Oboe and English Horn CD by Mark Hill, and others.

Formerly, a professor of music at Cal State Dominguez Hills, Cal State Northridge, Cal State Los Angeles, and other colleges in Southern California. Heussenstamm is the author of several books pertaining to music theory, including The Norton Manual of Music Notation, Hal Leonard Harmony & Theory – Part 1: Diatonic, and Hal Leonard Harmony & Theory – Part 2: Chromatic.  The Norton Manual of Music Notation has become a standard of music notation.

George Heussenstamm (b. 1926) received all of his musical training in the Southern California area. Winner of numerous national and international composition competitions, he is a member of ASCAP, is an honorary member of the international music fraternity, Sigma Alpha Iota, and is a former member of the American Society of University Composers (now called SCI) and the International Society for Contemporary Music. He was a member of NACUSA (National Association of Composers, USA), in which he served as Vice- President for many years. In 1976 and 1981 he was the recipient of Fellowship Grants from the National Endowment for the Arts. Eight of his compositions were recorded on LP and six of these have been committed to CD. From 1971 to 1984 he was Manager of the Coleman Chamber Music Association, the oldest continuing chamber music series in the country.

Since 1976 Heussenstamm taught at Cal State Dominguez Hills, Cal State Los Angeles, Ambassador College, and steadily for 17 years at California State University, Northridge, prior to his retirement in June, 2000.   Composer of more than 85 published works, he is the author of the book, The Norton Manual of Music Notation, released by W.W. Norton and Co. in March, 1987, and still a mainstay in the literature about the notation of music, making Heussenstamm one of the leading authorities in this field. He has also written a two-volume textbook on tonal harmony, Handbook of Harmony, which was the required harmony textbook at CSUN for several years. It has now been published in two volumes by Hal Leonard Corp. under the title, Hal Leonard Theory and Harmony and is available at book stores everywhere. His Handbook of Tonal Counterpoint, as yet unfinished, is written in a style geared for maximum comprehension by college-level students.
          
Composing in a wide spectrum of media, George Heussenstamm's compositions have been performed with regularity both here and abroad. He is perhaps best known for his large-scale compositions for saxophone and brass ensembles.  His final large work, Moire for strings, is a magnificent work of texture and contemporary string technique and was premiered by the University of Southern California Symphony string section in 1990.  In 2016, George became the benefactor of a choral music contest thru the California Choral Directors Association (then ACDA California).  George has funded the CCDA/Heussenstamm Choral Composition Competition for a total of ten years.  From his generous donations, California composers are able to attend the CCDA Summer Conference at ECCO for free, have the chance to have their winning piece read by the entire conference, and earn a $500 bonus.  It is a great way to inspire composers to create new and exciting choral music for the future.
          
Among his non-academic activities are fishing, pocket billiards, going to concerts, and Scrabble. He was for 17 years the director of a Scrabble club in Glendale, California, and was chosen as Director of the Year in 1991 by the National Scrabble Association. He is an avid follower of national and international affairs, his primary source being BBC World Service over XM satellite radio. Married in 1957, his wife, Mary Heussenstamm (1930-2005), was a locally well-known watercolor portraitist. Her book, Watercolor Portraits Painted on the Streets of Los Angeles, has been widely acclaimed.

References

External links
The Music of George Heussenstamm
Handbook of Tonal Counterpoint
Interview with George Heussenstamm, April 29, 1991

1926 births
Living people
American male composers
21st-century American composers
California State University, Los Angeles faculty
California State University, Northridge faculty
People from La Crescenta-Montrose, California
21st-century American male musicians